Richard Rush (August 29, 1780 – July 30, 1859) was the 8th United States Attorney General and the 8th United States Secretary of the Treasury. He also served as John Quincy Adams's running mate on the National Republican ticket in 1828.

Born in Philadelphia to Benjamin Rush, a prominent physician and Founding Father, Richard Rush graduated from the College of New Jersey in 1797 and pursued a legal career. After gaining renown for his oratorical skills, he was appointed as Attorney General of Pennsylvania in 1811. Later that year, President James Madison appointed Rush to the position of Comptroller of the Treasury, and Rush became one of Madison's closest advisers during the War of 1812. Madison elevated Rush to the position of United States Attorney General in 1814. Rush remained in that position after James Monroe took office, and he also briefly served as the acting Secretary of State. In this capacity he concluded the Rush–Bagot Treaty, which limited naval armaments on the Great Lakes.

After John Quincy Adams returned to the United States to assume the position of Secretary of State, Rush was appointed as the ambassador to Britain. In 1825, Rush accepted Adams's offer to serve as Secretary of the Treasury. When Adams sought re-election in 1828, he chose Rush as his running mate, but Adams lost the presidential election to Andrew Jackson. After the election, Rush served as a diplomat for various groups, and he helped establish the Smithsonian Institution. During the presidency of James K. Polk, Rush served as the minister to France. He returned to the United States in 1849 and died in Philadelphia in 1859.

Early life and education
Rush was born in Philadelphia, Pennsylvania. He was the second son, and third child, of Benjamin Rush (one of the signers of the Declaration of Independence and a prominent physician) and Julia (Stockton) Rush, daughter of Richard Stockton (another signer of the Declaration of Independence) and Annis Boudinot Stockton. He entered the College of New Jersey (now known as Princeton University) at the age of 14, and graduated in 1797 as the youngest member of his class. He was admitted to the bar in 1800, when he was barely 20 years old.

Rush married Catherine Eliza Murray on August 29, 1809. They were the parents of ten children, of whom three sons and two daughters survived him.

Lawyer
After his entering the bar in 1800, Rush quickly gained statewide and then national attention as a public speaker and successful trial lawyer. In 1811 he was appointed Attorney General of Pennsylvania. Shortly before this he had declined an offer to run for Congress. In November 1811, President James Madison appointed Rush Comptroller of the Treasury.

Federal government service
From the position as Comptroller of the treasury, albeit a subordinate position, Rush functioned as one of President Madison's closest friends and confidential advisors throughout the War of 1812. He was one of the War Hawks who advocated war with Britain. In 1814 Madison offered Rush the choice of Secretary of the Treasury or Attorney General of the United States, of which positions Rush chose the latter. With his appointment as Attorney General, Rush became the youngest person to serve in that office. Rush served as United States Attorney General from 1814 to 1817. At this time the attorney generalship was a part-time position, and so Rush also maintained his private law practice while in this office. On top of this he edited a codification of United States laws during this time.

He was acting Secretary of State from the start of James Monroe's term as president until the return of John Quincy Adams from Europe. During this time Rush concluded the Rush-Bagot Convention, demilitarizing the Canadian boundary on the Great Lakes.

In October 1817, Rush was appointed Minister to Britain to succeed John Quincy Adams, who had taken the position of Secretary of State upon his return. His "gentlemanly" attitude was appreciated by the British, and he remained there for nearly eight years, proving singularly effective in negotiating a number of important treaties, including the Anglo-American Treaty of 1818.

He became surprisingly popular in England, despite his previous anti-British record. In 1823, Rush negotiated with Britain over British proposals that the two countries issue a joint declaration against French involvement in Spain's rebelling American colonies, but Britain would not agree to American demands for recognition of the newly independent republics, leading to the separate American declaration of the Monroe Doctrine.

Richard Rush received one electoral vote as a Federalist for the office of U.S. Vice President in the 1820 election, even though the Federalist Party nominated no candidate for U.S. President in that election. And then again in March–April 1824, Richard Rush was again honored with a single vote at the Democratic-Republican Party Caucus to be the party's candidate for the Office of U.S. Vice President for the upcoming 1824 election. 

Upon the election of John Quincy Adams in 1825, Rush (having made a study of Britain, and the British Navy in particular, while he was there) desired to become the Secretary of the Navy. Adams, however, immediately nominated him for the post of 8th Secretary of the Treasury, which he accepted. He served in this position with remarkable success during the entire Adams Administration from March 7, 1825 until March 5, 1829. Notably, he paid off nearly the whole public debt, and turned over to his successor a large treasury surplus.

In 1828, he was a candidate for Vice President on the re-election ticket with John Quincy Adams, but was defeated. After leaving the Treasury Department, he was sent to England and the Netherlands by the cities of Georgetown and Alexandria to negotiate a large loan for the cities, a mission that met with prompt success.

In 1836, President Andrew Jackson sent him to England as Commissioner to secure for the United States the legacy left the government by James Smithson. He was successful in this undertaking, bringing to this country the sum of $508,318.46, which would eventually be used to establish the Smithsonian Institution in Washington, D.C. Rush later became one of the first regents of the institution.

After a short time with the Anti-Masonic Party, in the later 1830s Rush became a member of the Democratic Party.

In 1847, Richard Rush was appointed as Minister to France by President James K. Polk. When his negotiations were interrupted by the overthrow of King Louis-Philippe, he was among the first foreign diplomats to recognize the new French Second Republic. He remained in France until his recall by the new Whig administration in 1849, when he returned to the land of his birth, to retire in Philadelphia. He died there on July 30, 1859, and is buried at Laurel Hill Cemetery in Philadelphia. Prior to his death, Rush had been the last surviving member of the Madison, Monroe, and Adams Cabinets.

Societies
Rush was elected a member of the American Antiquarian Society in 1814. In 1817, Rush elected a member of the American Philosophical Society. During the 1820s, Rush was a member of the prestigious society, Columbian Institute for the Promotion of Arts and Sciences, who counted among their members former presidents Andrew Jackson and John Quincy Adams and many prominent men of the day, including well-known representatives of the military, government service, medical and other professions.

References

Sources
This article contains material from the U.S. Department of Justice Attorneys General of the United States, which, as a U.S. government publication, is in the public domain.

External links

 
 
 

|-

|-

|-

|-

1780 births
1859 deaths
19th-century American diplomats
19th-century American politicians
Ambassadors of the United States to France
Ambassadors of the United States to the United Kingdom
Anti-Masonic Party politicians from Pennsylvania
Burials at Laurel Hill Cemetery (Philadelphia)
Comptrollers of the United States Treasury
John Quincy Adams administration cabinet members
Members of the American Antiquarian Society
Pennsylvania Attorneys General
Pennsylvania Democrats
Pennsylvania lawyers
Politicians from Philadelphia
Princeton University alumni
Madison administration cabinet members
Monroe administration cabinet members
Pennsylvania Federalists
Pennsylvania National Republicans
Stockton family of New Jersey
United States Attorneys General
Candidates in the 1832 United States presidential election
United States Secretaries of the Treasury
1820 United States vice-presidential candidates
1828 United States vice-presidential candidates
Acting United States Secretaries of State